In Norse mythology, Vár or Vór (Old Norse, meaning either "pledge" or "beloved") is a goddess associated with oaths and agreements. Vár is attested in the Poetic Edda, compiled in the 13th century from earlier traditional sources; the Prose Edda, written in the 13th century by Snorri Sturluson; and kennings found in skaldic poetry and a runic inscription. Scholars have proposed theories about the implications of the goddess.

Attestations
In the Poetic Edda poem Þrymskviða, the blessing of Vár is invoked by the jötunn Þrymr after his "bride" (who is actually the god Thor disguised as the goddess Freyja) is hallowed with the stolen hammer of Thor, Mjöllnir, at their wedding:

In the chapter 35 of the Prose Edda book Gylfaginning, High tells Gangleri (described as king Gylfi in disguise) about the ásynjur. High lists Vár ninth among the sixteen ásynjur he presents in the chapter and provides some information about her:
Ninth Var: she listens to people's oaths and private agreements that women and men make between each other. Thus these contracts are called varar. She also punishes those who break them.
In addition, Vár appears twice more in the Prose Edda. In chapter 75 of the Prose Edda book Skáldskaparmál Vár appears within a list of 27 ásynjur names. In chapter 87 the name Vár is employed in a kenning referring to the goddess Skaði ("bow-string-Vár") in the poem Haustlöng by the skald Þjóðólfr of Hvinir. A runic inscription inscribed on a stick from Bergen, Norway around the year 1300 records a common mercantile transaction followed by a verse from a displeased scribe that mentions Vár (edits applied per the translator's notes):
'Wise Var of wire ["woman of filigree," meaning "wise bejeweled woman"] makes (me) sit unhappy.
Eir [woman] of mackerels' ground [likely gold] takes often and much sleep from me.'
Mindy Macleod and Bernard Mees posit that the first line of the inscription essentially means "women make me miserable" or potentially "marriage makes me miserable," whereas the second line means "women often take a lot of sleep from me."

Theories
Regarding the ceremonial marital reference to Vár in Þrymskviða, Andy Orchard opines that "the antiquity of such a ritual is far from clear." Britt-Mari Näsström argues that, like many other minor goddesses, Vár was originally one of Freyja's names, "later apprehended as independent goddesses."

Rudolf Simek says that the goddesses Sága, Hlín, Sjöfn, Snotra, Vár, and Vör should be considered vaguely defined figures who "should be seen as female protective goddesses" that are all responsible for "specific areas of the private sphere, and yet clear differences were made between them so that they are in many ways similar to matrons."

Notes

References

 Bellows, Henry Adams (Trans.) (1923). The poetic Edda. New York: The American-Scandinavian Foundation.
 Byock, Jesse (Trans.) (2005). The Prose Edda. Penguin Classics. 
 Faulkes, Anthony (Trans.) (1995). Snorri Sturluson: Edda. First published in 1987. London: Everyman. 
 Lindow, John (2001). Norse Mythology: A Guide to the Gods, Heroes, Rituals, and Beliefs. Oxford University Press. 
 Macleod, Mindy. Mees, Bernard (2006). Runic Amulets and Magic Objects. Boydell Press. 
 Näsström, Britt-Mari (2003). Freyja - the great Goddess of the North. Harwich Port: Clock & Rose, 2003. First published: University of Lund, 1995. .
 Orchard, Andy (1997). Dictionary of Norse Myth and Legend. Cassell. 
 Simek, Rudolf (2007) translated by Angela Hall. Dictionary of Northern Mythology. D.S. Brewer. 
 Thorpe, Benjamin (Trans.) (1866). Edda Sæmundar Hinns Frôða: The Edda of Sæmund the Learned. Part I. London: Trübner & Co.

Ásynjur
Justice goddesses